Dolly (stylised in all-caps) was an Australian bimonthly teen magazine started in 1970 by Fairfax Ltd. in Australia and New Zealand, and purchased by ACP in 1988. The magazine became an online-only publication, and the print edition ceased, in December 2016. In June 2020, the magazine was purchased from the Bauer Media Group by Mercury Capital.

Dolly was the basis and inspiration for Sassy Magazine (1987–1996) in the United States. The magazine was aimed at teenage girls (13–17 age group) and covered celebrity news and gossip, fashion and beauty and various feature articles attractive to female teenagers and dealing with issues that are faced by this age group and gender. The magazine produced over 400 issues and as of 2007 had a readership of 505,000. Dolly now exists only as a website containing games, information on upcoming issues, quizzes and downloads.

History
The magazine was launched by Anne Goldie in 1970.

The editor was Josephine Rozenberg-Clarke. The previous editor was Lucy Cousins. The magazine had its headquarters in Sydney.

In November 2016 it was announced that the December 2016 issue would be the last print issue of Dolly.

In June 2020, Dolly was acquired by Sydney investment firm Mercury Capital as part of its acquisition of the Bauer Media Group's former Australian and New Zealand titles.

Dolly Teen Choice Awards

Dolly Model competition 
The Dolly Model Competition was a branch from the Dolly magazine. It is a competition held for teen readers to enter to have the chance to win a modelling career. The competition started in 1979, with Helen Moyes appearing on the December 1979 issue as the first winner  and ended in 2002 when the then editor in chief of Dolly, Mia Freedman felt it gave a negative impression towards young teenage girls and the Dolly brand. In 2012 it returned after a 10-year hiatus, with the winner announced as 13-year-old Kirsty Thatcher from Brisbane, Australia. The winner will be awarded a one year contract with Chadwick Modeling agency, a trip to New York to meet with Chadwick's US affiliates, and a fashion and cover shoot on Dolly Magazine.

Miranda Kerr (who won in 1997) is now known world-wide and is a former Victoria's Secret model.

Past Winners

Dolly Doctor
Dolly Doctor was a segment that ran in Dolly since its first issue to answer readers' health questions.
 
John Wright was the first Dolly Doctor. Melissa Kang has been the Dolly Doctor since 1993, until the closing of the print edition. A Dolly Doctor standalone app was released in 2015.

A comparison of Dolly Doctor with other Australian magazines found that Dolly Doctor gave the most accurate health advice.

Dolly Doctor closed in 2016.

Controversy
In 2005, Dolly came into media attention for taking advantage of young people wanting to get into the magazine industry. Dolly was accused of soliciting, publishing and ridiculing unpaid articles from hopeful young women looking for a job in magazine journalism.

In Dolly's May 2007, a picture of a runway model's genitalia was published in a section called Dollywood Gossip. The accompanying caption included an arrow pointing to the model's genital region, and said "Look Closer, Eww! Not that close" and "Umm, we think you forgot something". Editor Bronwyn McCahon stated that "we did cover the area originally, and the little spot we used somehow fell off the page just before printing and we didn't notice".

References

External links
 Dolly magazine website

1970 establishments in Australia
2016 disestablishments in Australia
ACP magazine titles
Mercury Capital
Bi-monthly magazines published in Australia
Monthly magazines published in Australia
Defunct magazines published in Australia
Magazines established in 1970
Magazines disestablished in 2016
Magazines published in Sydney
Online magazines with defunct print editions
Teen magazines